Nowe Okniny  is a village in the administrative district of Gmina Wiśniew, within Siedlce County, Masovian Voivodeship, in east-central Poland.

The village has a population of 160.

References

Nowe Okniny